The 2010 Women's World Team Squash Championships is the women's edition of the 2010 World Team Squash Championships organized by the World Squash Federation, which serves as the world team championship for squash players. The tournament was organized by the World Squash Federation and Squash New Zealand. The events were held in Palmerston North, New Zealand and took place from November 28 to December 4, 2010. The Australia team won his ninth World Team Championships beating the English team in the final.

Participating teams
A total of 16 teams competed from all the five confederations: Africa, America, Asia, Europe, and Oceania. For Mexico, it was their first participation at a world team championship.

Seeds

Squads

  England
 Jenny Duncalf
 Laura Massaro
 Tania Bailey
 Sarah Kippax

  Netherlands
 Vanessa Atkinson
 Annelize Naudé
 Orla Noom
 Milou van der Heijden

  United States
 Natalie Grainger
 Latasha Khan
 Amanda Sobhy
 Olivia Blatchford

  Austria
 Birgit Coufal
 Sandra Polak
 Judith Gradnitzer
 Sabrina Rehman

  Australia
 Rachael Grinham
 Kasey Brown
 Sarah Fitz-Gerald
 Donna Urquhart

  Ireland
 Madeline Perry
 Aisling Blake
 Laura Mylotte
 Zoe Barr

  India
 Dipika Pallikal
 Joshna Chinappa
 Anaka Alankamony
 Anwesha Reddy

  Japan
 Misaki Kobayashi
 Miwa Maekawa
 Yuki Sakai
 Not Used

  Egypt
 Omneya Abdel Kawy
 Raneem El Weleily
 Engy Kheirallah
 Nour El Tayeb

  France
 Camille Serme
 Isabelle Stoehr
 Coline Aumard
 Maud Duplomb

  South Africa
 Tenille Swartz
 Siyoli Waters
 Milnay Louw
 Cheyna Tucker

  Mexico
 Samantha Terán
 Graciela Lopez Perez
 Nayelly Hernández
 Imelda Salazar Martinez

  New Zealand
 Jaclyn Hawkes
 Joelle King
 Shelley Kitchen
 Tamsyn Leevey

  Malaysia
 Nicol David
 Low Wee Wern
 Delia Arnold
 Sharon Wee

  Hong Kong
 Liu Tsz-Ling
 Elise Ng
 Carman Lee
 Karman Siu

  Canada
 Miranda Ranieri
 Alexandra Norman
 Stephanie Edmison
 Samantha Cornett

Group stage results

Pool A

Pool B

Pool C

Pool D

Finals

Draw

Results

Quarter-finals

Semi-finals

Final

Post-tournament team ranking

See also 
 World Team Squash Championships

References

External links 
Women's World Team Squash Championships 2010 Official Website
Women's World Team Squash Championships 2010 SquashSite Website

World Squash Championships
Squash
W
Squash tournaments in New Zealand
2010 in women's squash
International sports competitions hosted by New Zealand